Alex Groncier Gordon (born September 14, 1964) is a former American football linebacker who played in the National Football League from 1987 through 1993. He played college football at the University of Cincinnati.

According to an August 1987 Sports Illustrated article, Chicago Bears coach Mike Ditka wanted to draft Gordon in the first round (No. 26 overall) in the 1987 NFL Draft. However, Ditka was overruled by the Bears' front office, which instead selected Michigan quarterback Jim Harbaugh.

In 1995, Gordon began playing in the Canadian Football League for the U.S. expansion Memphis Mad Dogs. In that one season, he led the team with 61 tackles and 7 sacks.

In 1996, after the Mad Dogs folded, he was selected by the Toronto Argonauts during the dispersal draft.  He went on to win the 84th Grey Cup with the Argonauts that season.

References

External links
NFL.com player page

1964 births
Living people
American football linebackers
Canadian football linebackers
Cincinnati Bearcats football players
Cincinnati Bengals players
Los Angeles Raiders players
Memphis Mad Dogs players
New York Jets players
Players of American football from Jacksonville, Florida
Toronto Argonauts players